Beissel is a surname. Notable people with the surname include:

 Georg Conrad Beissel (1691–1768), a German-born religious leader in Pennsylvania, U.S.
 Graeme Beissel (born 1941), former Australian rules footballer
 Henry Beissel (born 1929), Canadian writer
 Heribert Beissel (1933–2021), German conductor
 Tom Beissel (born 1994), Dutch professional footballer